Gina Keali'inohomoku Bowes (born December 12) is an American voice actress known for playing Senna in the anime movie Bleach: Memories of Nobody. She had other roles, including Kiyal Bachika in Gurren Lagann, Little Red Riding Hood and Little Bo Peep in Happily N'Ever After 2: Snow White Another Bite @ the Apple, Asuka Kazama in Street Fighter X Tekken, and Daria, Freida and Fran in Alpha and Omega 4: The Legend of the Saw Tooth Cave. She is of Native American, Polynesian, Latin, South East Asian, and Middle Eastern descent.

Filmography

Anime
Aggretsuko - Gori, Tsunoda
Berserk - Charlotte 
Buso Renkin – Saori Kawai, Victoria
Diary of Our Days at the Breakwater – Natsumi Hodoka
Durarara!!×2 – Mairu Orihara
Ghost Slayers Ayashi – Shinzo (Ep. 13), Woman (Ep. 14)
Gurren Lagann – Kiyal Bachika
I's – College Girl C
King's Raid: Successors of the Will – Arlette
Marvel Anime: Blade – Lupit (Ep. 5)
Sailor Moon – Higure Akiyama (Ep. 16; Viz dub) 
Tweeny Witches – N

Animation
Angel Wars – Kira Robot Muriel (Spanish dub)
Doc McStuffins – Melinda the Mermaid
Flash Gordon Classic – Dale Arden
Phineas and Ferb – Additional Voices
Love, Death & Robots – Beth (Ep. "Suits")
Sofia the First – Empress Lin-Lin, Queen Anya, Additional Voices
Special Agent Oso – Mom, Miss Rollins
Spirit Rangers – Sunka
The Emperor's New School – Girl Fan
The Lion Guard – Sasem

Films
Alpha and Omega: Family Vacation – Fran, Freida
Alpha and Omega 4: The Legend of the Saw Tooth Cave – Daria, Freida, Fran
Berserk: Golden Age Arc – Charlotte (Movies 2-3)
Bleach: Memories of Nobody – Senna
Delhi Safari – News Reporter 1
Golden Winter – Tinkle, Mother Dog
Happily N'Ever After 2: Snow White Another Bite @ the Apple – Little Red Riding Hood, Little Bo Peep
Norm of the North – Female Tourist
The Swan Princess Christmas – Caretaker
Throne of Elves - Elf Captain
Monster Hunter: Legends of the Guild - Nadia

Video games
Barbie iDesign – Barbie
Cookie Run: Kingdom - Moonlight Cookie
Dying Light: The Following — Ezgi
Fire Emblem Heroes - Erinys
Fallout 76: Wild Appalachia – Christina Bryan, Clara Song
Guardian Tales – Rie
Guild Wars 2 – Hannah
Kingdom Hearts III – Additional Voices
Marvel vs. Capcom 3: Fate of Two Worlds/Ultimate Marvel vs. Capcom 3 – Felicia
Metal Gear Solid V: The Phantom Pain – Diamond Dog Soldier
Minecraft: Story Mode – Maya, Ivy, Fangirl
Palace Pets – Teacup
Pet Vet Paws and Claws – Tess, Keri
Relayer – Additional voices
Resident Evil 5 – Majini Female
Rodea the Sky Soldier
Rune Factory: Tides of Destiny – Lily, Sierra
Street Fighter V – Laura
Street Fighter X Tekken – Asuka Kazama
Back 4 Blood, Tunnels of Terror expansion pack - Sharice

References

External links

Actresses from Los Angeles
American people of Cuban descent
American people of French Polynesian descent
American people of Middle Eastern descent
American people who self-identify as being of Native American descent
American video game actresses
American voice actresses
Place of birth missing (living people)
Living people
21st-century American actresses
Year of birth missing (living people)